The Caproni-Campini Ca.183bis was an Italian projected high-altitude fighter intended to have both piston and jet propulsion.

Design and development
One 20 mm or 30 mm cannon was to be in the propeller hub with four more 20 mm cannon in the wings. Weight was to be .

The prototype was 80% complete by the time of the armistice. After Mussolini escaped from captivity with German help and became the nominal leader of the Italian Social Republic in September 1943, Italian work continued on the prototype. However, various attacks against military structures slowed the development and the prototype was probably destroyed  in 1944.

Specifications (Daimler-Benz DB605)

See also

References

Sources

External links

Ca.183bis
1940s Italian fighter aircraft